Rocío Yolanda Angélica Silva-Santisteban Manrique (born 30 January 1963) is a Peruvian poet, academic, activist, and journalist. Since March 2020, she serves as a Member of Congress for the Lima constituency representing the Broad Front. Previously, she served as Executive Secretary of the National Human Rights Coordinator.

External links

References

Peruvian poets
Peruvian journalists
National University of San Marcos alumni
Boston University alumni
1963 births
Living people
Members of the Congress of the Republic of Peru
21st-century Peruvian politicians
21st-century Peruvian women politicians
Women members of the Congress of the Republic of Peru